"All Growed Up" is a special episode of Rugrats that aired on July 21, 2001 to celebrate the series' tenth anniversary. The special serves as the first two episodes of the eighth season of Rugrats, and the 145th and 146th episodes of the series overall. The episode's premise was to focus on what the babies' lives would be like if they were ten years older. The episode proved to be popular enough for a series based on it to be made.

Plot

When the babies are watching a science fiction oriented movie about a time-traveling machine, Angelica shows them her new "tapiyokie" (karaoke) machine. She forbids the babies to play with it, but, as with many of her toys, they do. Angelica is angry and chases the babies into a closet, with Angelica on the outside. Angelica starts counting to ten for them to come out, and Tommy suggests they go to "the foocher" (the future) so that they will be grown up enough for Angelica not to boss them around anymore. Angelica says multiple random numbers in incorrect order before reaching 10, giving the babies enough time to rig the karaoke machine into a time-travel device. At the exact moment Angelica reaches ten, Tommy pushes a button, and there is a swirling orange vortex, and the babies see themselves in the future, now ten years older.

The gang stumbles out of the closet, and teenage Angelica demands her CD of popstar Emica's songs back. They explain that they had borrowed the CD to learn the lyrics in hopes that Emica will call one of them up to sing with her during her concert the next night. Nine-year-old Dil is shown to have an unusual personality, and Angelica states that it is because Phil and Lil dropped him on his head when he was a baby. Stu has a disco dance on the same night of the concert, and plans to wear his lucky zodiac necklace, one similar to Emica's.

When the gang leaves for middle school, Tommy, Dil, and Angelica's grandfather and Stu and Drew's father, Lou, is now a bus driver. Angelica's friend Samantha Shane, whom Chuckie has a crush on, tells Angelica that she is going to the Emica concert. Angelica denies being related to Tommy despite sharing his last name, and claims that she is going to wear the zodiac necklace that Emica (and Stu) wears. She asks Tommy to steal his father's necklace, so she will look like she told the truth to her friend, offering to introduce Samantha to Chuckie in return. Tommy plans to ask Stu if he can borrow the necklace for the night, but quickly realizes it is easier said than done when Stu says he cannot dance without it. Tommy makes a fake necklace by wrapping a round dog biscuit in gold foil with the zodiac sign drawing and switches it out for the real necklace. Unexpectedly, the now old and overweight Spike eats the decoy overnight, then mistakes the real necklace for another one and takes it. Stu finds out the next morning, and Tommy takes the blame for stealing it. Upset and reluctant to do so, Stu and Didi ground Tommy from attending the Emica concert, much to Dil's dismay, and because of this, Angelica refuses to introduce Chuckie to Samantha.

Stu and Didi hire Susie to babysit Tommy while they are at the dance, as she is unable to attend the Emica concert. Lil finds the necklace in the sandbox, as Spike buried it there once he discovered it was not a dog biscuit like the decoy was, and the gang convince a reluctant Tommy to come with them to return the necklace to Stu. Susie (who is watching the same sci-fi film as the babies did at the beginning of the episode) catches them as they leave the house, stating that she knows when they are always up to something. She then eagerly goes with the gang to return the necklace. On the way, they ride their bikes by the concert, where Angelica, who is nervously facing peer pressure from Samantha, runs towards them to get the necklace. Tommy confronts Angelica and tells her that he cannot give her the necklace because he should not have agreed to their deal and that she should have introduced Samantha to Chuckie in the first place, and urges her to tell the truth. Wanting the necklace but ultimately feeling remorse, Angelica admits to Samantha that the necklace belonged to Tommy's dad and also reveals that she and Tommy are cousins. As a way to try to make up, she introduces Chuckie to Samantha as "Charlie Finster, III". Samantha shares her experiences with braces to Chuckie as he is wearing them also, and the two are smitten with each other. As one more act of kindness, Angelica gives her ticket to Susie.

They return Stu's necklace in the middle of his performance, and Stu can dance. The kids then head off to the concert, where Angelica decides to head home and let the others enjoy it. Tommy offers to give Angelica his ticket as a thanks, but as she declines, Lou then arrives with two tickets: one was intended for his wife, Lulu, but he gives it to Angelica because she is away on a trip. At the concert, Emica calls Tommy up to sing, but Angelica begs to be up too, and Emica agrees. After a short period of getting along with singing (and flashbacks of clips from the entire gang's baby years), Angelica and Tommy start to fight over the microphone. They struggle to what seems as backstage, but travel back into the closet in the present day, where Angelica and the babies are fighting over the karaoke machine and end up breaking it. After Angelica yells at them for this, Tommy states he is glad that Angelica will be nicer to them in ten more years, but then Angelica finds Dil's drool over her player and reaches her breaking point. The episode ends with Angelica chasing the babies and screaming for Didi as Chuckie asks Tommy if ten years will be a very long time.

DVD and VHS releases
The special alongside the other Rugrats episode, "My Fair Babies" and the spinoff's episodes, "Susie Sings The Blues" and "Coup DeVille" is on the 2003 DVD release, All Grown Up: Growing Up Changes Everything and the original 2001 VHS release, All Growed Up containing both "All Growed Up" and "My Fair Babies". The special was also included on the Nick Picks: Vol. 2 DVD, released in 2005.

Featured characters

The special features characters from the show and the show's sequel.

Characters from Rugrats timeline

Tommy Pickles
Dil Pickles
Chuckie Finster
Kimi Finster

Phil and Lil DeVille
Angelica Pickles
Didi Pickles

Characters from the future

Tommy Pickles
Dil Pickles
Chuckie Finster
Kimi Finster
Phil and Lil DeVille
Angelica Pickles
Susie Carmichael
Samantha Shane
Ticket Taker

Stu Pickles
Didi Pickles
Grandpa Lou Pickles
Chas Finster
Drew Pickles
Charlotte Pickles
Emica
Judge
Lulu (mentioned)
Kira (mentioned)

Video game

Rugrats: All Growed-Up is a 2001 single-player adventure platform game for the Microsoft Windows. It is inspired by the Rugrats tenth anniversary special and is the only Rugrats game that features the Rugrats as preteens. In it, the babies have been catapulted ten years into the future. The goal of the game, in order to get home, is to find pieces of a time machine scattered around Dr. Spooky's castle. During the game, you can play as either Tommy Pickles, Chuckie Finster, Dil Pickles, or Kimi Finster, and Reptar, who is unlocked later in the game. Angelica is not a playable character. She instead provides narration for the game.

References

External links

2001 American television episodes
American television films
Rugrats and All Grown Up! episodes
Anniversary television episodes
Older versions of cartoon characters
Television pilots within series
Animated films about children
Animated films about siblings
Films set in Burbank, California
Television episodes set in California
Nickelodeon animated films